Saint Gordius (or Gordinus; died ) was a Christian soldier in Cappadocia who was dismissed from the army, lived as a hermit for a while, then returned and made an open declaration of his faith, for which he was martyred. His feast day is 3 January.

Roman Martyrology

The Roman Martyrology as of 1916 for the Third Day of January says,

Monks of Ramsgate account

The monks of St Augustine's Abbey, Ramsgate wrote in their Book of Saints (1921),

Butler's account

The hagiographer Alban Butler (1710–1773) wrote in his Lives of the Fathers, Martyrs, and Other Principal Saints under January 3,

Notes

Sources

 
 
 

Saints from Roman Greece
315 deaths